The Armenoid race was a supposed sub-race in the context of a now-outdated model of dividing humanity into different races which was developed originally by Europeans in support of colonialism. The Armenoid race was variously described (depending on author) as a "sub-race" of the "Aryan race" or the "Caucasian race" (e.g. by Carleton Coon).

History of term
The term was used by Austrian anthropologist Felix von Luschan and Eugen Petersen in the 1889 book Reisen in Lykien, Milyas und Kibyratis ("Travel in Lycia, Milyas and Kibyratis"). Carleton Coon (1904–81) described the regions of Western Asia such as Anatolia, the Caucasus, Iraq, Iran, and the Levant as the center of distribution of the Armenoid race.

Prominent Nazi and racial theorist Hans F. K. Günther used the term 'Near Eastern race' to describe the Armenoid type, and ascribed Near Eastern characteristics to several contemporary peoples, including:  Armenians, Jews, Greeks, Iranians, Assyrians, Syrians, and Turks. Günther regarded Jews as people of multiple racial origins but defined the Near Eastern race as their major basis, and described the race's characteristics such as its "commercial spirit" and as being "artful traders" who had strong psychological manipulation capacities that helped their trade, as well as being known to exploit people. Günther's conception has been criticized for pseudoscientific analysis. Nazis historically identified Jews as within the Armenoid type in the name of the Near Eastern race.

The Nazis never fully clarified their racial doctrine, and Günther' s work was never canonised or entirely accepted even by the SS, who switched freely between race definitions.

Physiognomy
Carleton S. Coon wrote that the Armenoid racial type is very similar to the Dinaric race, most probably due to racial mixture with the Mediterraneans (who often have olive skin) and the Alpines (who often have pale skin). The only difference is that Armenoids have a slightly darker pigmentation. He described the Armenoid as a sub-race of the Caucasoid race. Armenoids were said to be found throughout Eurasia, predominantly in Armenia, Transcaucasia, Iran, and Mesopotamia. This racial type was believed to be prevalent among some Armenians, Assyrians, and northern, central and south-eastern Iraqis.

See also 
 Caucasian race
 Dinaric race
 Historical race concepts
 Race and society  
 Race (human categorization)  
 Degeneration Theory 
 Polygenism
 Recent African origin of modern humans 
 Superior: The Return of Race Science

References

External links
 Rutherford, Adam. "Why racism is not backed by science", The Guardian 
 Race (Encyclopædia Britannica) 
 Race (Stamford Encyclopedia of Philosophy) 
Phil Gasper The Return of Scientific Racism
Carleton S. Coon The Races of Europe 

Critical Race Theory (Centre for Research on Race and Education; University of Birmingham)  
 Four statements on the race question UNESCO Digital Library

Historical definitions of race